Batéké Plateau National Park is a national park on the Bateke Plateau, southeastern Gabon covering . Due to its purported universal cultural and natural significance, it was added onto the UNESCO World Heritage Tentative List on October 20, 2005.

The Bateke Plateau Forest Savanna depicts the landscape of Central Africa. This national park harbours a rich biodiversity.

Fauna
In 2015, a single male lion was recorded in the park. Genetic analysis of his hair samples revealed that he is closely related to historical lion specimens from this area and the neighbouring Republic of the Congo, which grouped with Panthera leo melanochaita samples from Namibia and Botswana.

Commercial hunting on the plateau in order to satisfy the markets in Congo and Gabon, especially large mammals, is a significant threat to the local fauna.

See also
 Wildlife of Gabon

References

External links 
 Wildlife Conservation Society
 Virtual Tour of the National Parks
 Parc national des Plateaux Batéké - UNESCO World Heritage Centre Retrieved on 2009-03-19.

National parks of Gabon
Protected areas established in 2002
2002 establishments in Gabon
Western Congolian forest–savanna mosaic